The WAGR M class was a class of  Garratt-type articulated steam locomotives operated by the Western Australian Government Railways (WAGR) between 1912 and 1955. A total of 13 of them were built by Beyer, Peacock & Co, Manchester in two batches.

History
The first batch of six engines, was built in 1911. This batch, which entered WAGR service in 1912, was only the third Garratt design to be built, and represented a significant step in the development of the type. The second batch, of seven engines, was built in 1913/14, and was designated as the Ms class because its members were superheated. One of the engines in the first batch was later fitted with a superheater and reclassified as an Ms class engine.

All of the M/Ms class locomotives were used to haul trains on the WAGR's light lines. They were withdrawn from service between 1947 and 1955, and all were scrapped.

Class lists

M class list
The numbers and periods in service of each member of the M class were as follows:

Ms class list
The numbers and periods in service of each member of the Ms class were:

Namesakes
The M class designation was previously used for the M class locomotives that were withdrawn in 1911. It was reused in the 1970s when the M class diesel locomotives entered service.

See also

History of rail transport in Western Australia
List of Western Australian locomotive classes

References

Notes

Bibliography

External links

Beyer, Peacock locomotives
Garratt locomotives
Railway locomotives introduced in 1912
M WAGR class (1912)
2-6-0+0-6-2 locomotives
3 ft 6 in gauge locomotives of Australia
Freight locomotives
Scrapped locomotives